Ameselum was an ancient town of Sicily, on the road between Centuripae (modern Centuripe) and Agyrium (modern Agira). The town was taken in 269 BCE by the forces of Hiero II of Syracusae.

References

See also
Regalbuto

Former populated places in Italy
Ancient cities in Sicily
269 BC
3rd-century BC disestablishments
Regalbuto